Christmas University Challenge is a British quiz programme which has aired on BBC Two since 2011. It is a spin-off from University Challenge that airs daily over the Christmas period, and features teams of noteworthy alumni from British universities competing in the same format as the parent show.

The current holders are Balliol College, Oxford, who won Paxman's final episode on 30 December 2022. From December 2023 onwards, Amol Rajan will take over from Jeremy Paxman as host of the Christmas version of the long-running student quiz.

Series

2011

2011 results
Winning teams are highlighted in bold.
Teams with green scores (winners) returned in the next round, while those with red scores (losers) were eliminated.
Teams with orange scores won their match but did not achieve a high enough score to proceed to the next round.

First Round

Semi-finals

Final

The 2011 series was won by Trinity College, Cambridge whose team of Robin Bhattacharyya, Daisy Goodwin, John Lloyd, and Edward Stourton beat the University of Warwick's team of Vadim Jean, Daisy Christodoulou, Christian Wolmar and Carla Mendonça.

2012

2012 results
Winning teams are highlighted in bold.
Teams with green scores (winners) returned in the next round, while those with red scores (losers) were eliminated.
Teams with orange scores won their match but did not achieve a high enough score to proceed to the next round.
A score in italics indicates a match decided on a tie-breaker question.

First Round

Semi-finals

Final

The 2012 series was won by New College, Oxford whose team of Rachel Johnson, Patrick Gale, Kate Mosse and Yan Wong beat the University of East Anglia's team of John Boyne, Razia Iqbal, David Grossman and Charlie Higson.

2013

2013 results
Winning teams are highlighted in bold.
Teams with green scores (winners) returned in the next round, while those with red scores (losers) were eliminated.
Teams with orange scores won their match but did not achieve a high enough score to proceed to the next round.

First Round

Semi-finals

Final

The 2013 series was won by Gonville and Caius College, Cambridge whose team of Quentin Stafford-Fraser, Helen Castor, Mark Damazer and Lars Tharp beat Emmanuel College, Cambridge and their team of Hugo Rifkind, Mary-Ann Ochota, Simon Singh and Rory McGrath.

2014

2014 results
Winning teams are highlighted in bold.
Teams with green scores (winners) returned in the next round, while those with red scores (losers) were eliminated.
Teams with orange scores won their match but did not achieve a high enough score to proceed to the next round.

First Round

Semi-finals

Final

The 2014 series was won by Trinity Hall, Cambridge whose team of Tom James, Emma Pooley, Adam Mars-Jones and Dan Starkey beat the University of Hull and their team of Rosie Millard, Malcolm Sinclair, Jenni Murray and Stan Cullimore.

2015

2015 results
Winning teams are highlighted in bold.
Teams with green scores (winners) returned in the next round, while those with red scores (losers) were eliminated.
Teams with orange scores won their match but did not achieve a high enough score to proceed to the next round.
A score in italics indicates a match decided on a tie-breaker question.

First Round

Semi-finals

Final

The 2015 series was won by Magdalen College, Oxford whose team of Robin Lane Fox, Heather Berlin, Louis Theroux and Matt Ridley beat the University of Sheffield and their team of Sid Lowe, Nicci Gerrard, Adam Hart and Ruth Reed.

2016

2016 results
 Winning teams are highlighted in bold.
 Teams with green scores (winners) returned in the next round, while those with red scores (losers) were eliminated.
 Teams with orange scores won their match but did not achieve a high enough score to proceed to the next round.
 A score in italics indicates a match decided on a tie-breaker question.

First Round

Semi-finals

Final

The 2016 series was won by St Hilda's College, Oxford whose team of Fiona Caldicott, Daisy Dunn, Val McDermid and Adele Geras beat the University of Leeds and their team of Louise Doughty, Gus Unger-Hamilton, Kamal Ahmed and Steve Bell.

2017

2017 results
Winning teams are highlighted in bold.
Teams with green scores (winners) returned in the next round, while those with red scores (losers) were eliminated.
Teams with orange scores won their match but did not achieve a high enough score to proceed to the next round.

First Round

Semi-finals

Final

The 2017 series was won by Keble College, Oxford whose team of Paul Johnson, Frank Cottrell-Boyce, Katy Brand and Anne-Marie Imafidon beat the University of Reading and their team of Anna Machin, Martin Hughes-Games, Sophie Walker and Pippa Greenwood.

2018

2018 results
Winning teams are highlighted in bold.
Teams with green scores (winners) returned in the next round, while those with red scores (losers) were eliminated.
Teams with orange scores won their match but did not achieve a high enough score to proceed to the next round.

First Round

Semi-finals

Final

The 2018 series was won by Peterhouse, Cambridge whose team of Dan Mazer, Mark Horton, Michael Howard and Michael Axworthy beat the University of Bristol and their team of Philip Ball, Laura Wade, Misha Glenny and Iain Stewart.

2019

2019 results
Winning teams are highlighted in bold.
Teams with green scores (winners) returned in the next round, while those with red scores (losers) were eliminated.
Teams with orange scores won their match but did not achieve a high enough score to proceed to the next round.

First Round

Semi-finals

Final

The 2019 series was won by the University of Leeds whose team of Jonathan Clements, Henry Gee, Richard Coles and Timothy Allen beat Wadham College, Oxford and their team of Jonathan Freedland, Tom Solomon, Anne McElvoy and Roger Mosey.

2020

2020 results
Winning teams are highlighted in bold.
Teams with green scores (winners) returned in the next round, while those with red scores (losers) were eliminated.
Teams with orange scores won their match but did not achieve a high enough score to proceed to the next round.

First Round

Semi-finals

Final

The 2020 series was won by The Courtauld Institute of Art whose team of Tim Marlow, Lavinia Greenlaw, Jacky Klein and Jeremy Deller beat the University of Manchester and their team of David Nott, Juliet Jacques, Adrian Edmondson and Justin Edwards.

2021

2021 results
Winning teams are highlighted in bold.
Teams with green scores (winners) returned in the next round, while those with red scores (losers) were eliminated.
Teams with orange scores won their match but did not achieve a high enough score to proceed to the next round.

First Round

Semi-finals

Final

The 2021 series was won by the University of Edinburgh whose team of Catherine Slessor, Thomasina Miers, Miles Jupp and Phil Swanson beat Hertford College, Oxford and their team of Soweto Kinch, Elizabeth Norton, Adam Fleming and Isabelle Westbury.

2022

2022 results
Winning teams are highlighted in bold.
Teams with green scores (winners) returned in the next round, while those with red scores (losers) were eliminated.
Teams with orange scores won their match but did not achieve a high enough score to proceed to the next round.
A score in italics indicates a match decided on a  question.

First Round

Semi-finals

Final

The 2022 series was won by Balliol College, Oxford whose team of Elizabeth Kiss, Andrew Copson, Martin Edwards and Martin O’Neill beat the University of Hull and their team of Katharine Norbury, James Graham, Sian Reese-Williams and Graeme Hall. This was the last Christmas special to be hosted by Jeremy Paxman after 11 years.

External links
 University Challenge, Christmas 2011
 University Challenge, Christmas 2012
 University Challenge, Christmas 2013
 University Challenge, Christmas 2014
 University Challenge, Christmas 2015
 University Challenge, Christmas 2016
 University Challenge, Christmas 2017
 University Challenge, Christmas 2018
 University Challenge, Christmas 2019
 University Challenge, Christmas 2020
 University Challenge, Christmas 2021
 University Challenge, Christmas 2022

2010s British game shows
2011 British television series debuts
2020s British game shows
BBC television game shows
British television series based on American television series
British television spin-offs
English-language television shows
Quiz games
Television series by ITV Studios
Television shows produced by Granada Television
Universities in the United Kingdom
University Challenge